The Battle of Guiping took place on June 21, 1929, and was located in the western part of Guangxi, China. It was one of the civil war battles that took place inside the National Revolutionary Army. The warring sides of Guiping's battle, one was the Li Mingrui Division of the 15th Division of the National Army, and the other was the Wei Yunsong Brigade of the New Guangxi clique.

Bibliography
中華民國國防大學編，《中國現代軍事史主要戰役表》
Conflicts in 1929
1929 in China